Ishida Mitsunari (1559 – November 6, 1600) was a Japanese samurai and military commander of the late Sengoku period of Japan.  He is probably best remembered as the commander of the Western army in the Battle of Sekigahara following the Azuchi–Momoyama period of the 16th century.  He is also known by his court title, Jibu-no-shō (治部少輔).

Early life

He was born in 1559 at the north of Ōmi Province (which is now Nagahama city, Shiga Prefecture), and was the second son of Ishida Masatsugu, who was a retainer for the Azai clan. His childhood name was Sakichi. The Ishida withdrew from service after the Azai's defeat in 1573 at the Siege of Odani Castle. According to legend, he was a monk in a Buddhist temple before he served Toyotomi Hideyoshi, but the accuracy of this legend is doubted since it only came about during the Edo period.

Service under Hideyoshi
Mitsunari met Toyotomi Hideyoshi in 1577, when the former was still young and the latter was the daimyō of Nagahama. Later, Mitsunari became a Hideyoshi samurai officer. When Hideyoshi engaged in a campaign in the Chūgoku region, Mitsunari assisted his lord in attacks against castles like the Tottori Castle and Takamatsu Castle (in present-day Okayama).

Mitsunari served in the Battle of Shizugatake in 1583. According to the "Hitotsuyanagi Kaki," he was in charge of a mission to spy on Shibata Katsuie's army and also performed a great feat of Ichiban-yari (being the first to thrust a spear at an enemy soldier) as one of the warriors on the front line. Later,  he served in the Battle of Komaki and Nagakute in 1584. That same year, he worked as a "kenchi" (survey magistrate) at Gamo county in Omi Province.

After Hideyoshi seized power, Mitsunari became known as a talented financial manager due to his knowledge and skill at calculation. From 1585 onward, he was the administrator of Sakai, a role he took together with his elder brother Ishida Masazumi.  He was appointed one of the five bugyō, or top administrators of Hideyoshi's government, along with Asano Nagamasa, Maeda Gen'i, Mashita Nagamori and Natsuka Masaie.

Hideyoshi made him a daimyō of Sawayama in Ōmi Province, a five hundred thousand koku fief (now a part of Hikone). Sawayama Castle was known as one of the best-fortified castles during that time. In January 1586, he hired Shima Sakon, who was renowned as a commander having wisdom and courage. 

In 1588, Mitsunari was placed in charge of the famed “sword hunt” conducted by Hideyoshi in an effort to disarm the non-military bulk of the population and preserve peace.

Later, Mitsunari participated in the 1590 campaign against the Hōjō clan, where he commanded the Siege of Oshi and captured Oshi Castle.  Later, he was sent to Korea as one of the Three Bureaucrats with Mashita Nagamori and Asano Nagamasa.

Sekigahara Campaign

Mitsunari had high status among the bureaucrats of Hideyoshi's government, and was known for his unbending character. He had many friends; two of the most notable  being the famous samurais Ōtani Yoshitsugu and Shima Sakon. However, Mitsunari was on bad terms with some daimyōs that were known as good warriors, including Kuroda Nagamasa and Hachisuka Iemasa, as well as Hideyoshi's nephew Kobayakawa Hideaki. In particular, Kobayakawa Hideaki developed a grudge against Mitsunari as a result of rumors spread by Tokugawa Ieyasu that Mitsunari was behind his uncle's decision not to reward him with Chikugo after Kobayakawa's reckless behaviour at the Battle of Keicho. Toward the end of Taiko Hideyoshi's life, Hideyoshi ordered the execution of his heir Hidetsugu and Hidetsugu's family, leaving his new heir to be the extremely young child, Toyotomi Hideyori.  

After Hideyoshi's death, the conflicts in the court worsened. The central point of the conflict was the question of whether Tokugawa Ieyasu could be relied on as a supporter of the Toyotomi government, whose nominal lord was still a child, with actual leadership falling to a council of regents. After the death of the respected "neutral" Maeda Toshiie in 1599, the conflict came to arms, with Mitsunari forming an alliance of Toyotomi loyalists to stand against Tokugawa Ieyasu. Mitsunari's support came largely from the three of Hideyoshi's regents: Ukita Hideie, Mōri Terumoto, and Uesugi Kagekatsu, who came from the south and west of Japan, with the addition of the Uesugi clan in the north. Tokugawa Ieyasu's support came from central and eastern Japan, but he still exercised influence and intimidation over some of the Western lords. The titular head of the Western alliance was Mōri Terumoto, but Mōri stayed entrenched in Osaka castle; the leadership fell to Mitsunari in the field. 

In mid 1600, the campaign begin. Mitsunari besieged Fushimi Castle before marching into direct conflict with Tokugawa's alliance at Sekigahara. In October 21, at the Battle of Sekigahara, a number of lords stayed neutral, watching the battle from afar, not wishing to join in the losing side. Tokugawa's forces gained the edge in the battle with the betrayal of Kobayakawa Hideaki to their side, and won the battle.

Death
After his defeat at Sekigahara, Mitsunari sought to escape but was caught by villagers. He was beheaded in Kyoto. Other daimyōs of the Western army, like Konishi Yukinaga and Ankokuji Ekei were also executed. After execution, his head, severed from his body, was placed on a stand for all the people in Kyoto to see. His remains were buried at Sangen-in, a sub-temple of the Daitoku-ji, Kyoto.

A legend says that Ieyasu showed him mercy but hid him, for political reasons, with one of his veteran generals, Sakakibara Yasumasa, where he grew old and died of natural causes. To thank Yasumasa for his silence, Mitsunari gave him a tantō nicknamed Ishida Sadamune (石田貞宗) – a National Treasure of Japan.

In general, traditional Japanese historiography did not pay much attention to Mitsunari's legacy, as he lost and Tokugawa won; he was often portrayed as a weak bureaucrat.  His reputation has somewhat recovered since then, with later historians note his skill in planning and earlier battlefield victories, and that Sekigahara could easily have gone the other way had a few more lords on his side stayed loyal.

Family
Mitsunari had three sons (Shigeie, Shigenari, and Sakichi) and three daughters (only the younger girl's name is known, Tatsuhime) with his wife. After his father's death, Shigenari changed his family name to Sugiyama to keep living.

Swords

Ishida Masamune sword
The katana nicknamed Ishida Masamune, made by the master swordsmith Masamune, was formerly owned by Ishida Mitsunari. It is an Important Cultural Property according to the Agency for Cultural Affairs, and is held in the Tokyo National Museum.

Tantō of Hyūga Masamune
The Tantō "Hyūga Masamune", also made by Masamune, was also in the possession of Ishida Mitsunari. He gave this sword to the husband of his younger sister; the sword was stolen during the Battle of Sekigahara by Mizuno Katsushige, governor of Hyūga Province. It is a National Treasure of Japan, and is currently held in the Mitsui Memorial Museum.

Fictional portrayals
In James Clavell's novel Shōgun, Ishida served as basis for the character of "Ishido". Ishido was portrayed by Nobuo Kaneko in the 1980 TV mini-series adaptation.

Mitsunari appears in the 1989 film Rikyu by Hiroshi Teshigahara.

In the 2017 film Sekigahara, Mitsunari is the main character and is portrayed quite sympathetically.  This version of Mitsunari is dismayed at Hideyoshi's execution of his heir and regent, recruits allies interested in ruling with justice, is uncomfortable with taking families hostage as leverage, genuinely seeks the best for Hideyoshi's heir, and is in general a forthright and honest type.  His rival Tokugawa is portrayed as more of a schemer.  The director, Masato Harada, saw Mitsunari as a more modern type of ruler, ahead of his time.

Mitsunari is a character in the Sengoku Basara franchise where he is portrayed more as a warrior loyal to Hideyoshi as opposed to an administrator and a general.  He excels in using Iaido and darkness-based attacks there. In one anime he hates Ieyasu Tokugawa but in the other Ieyasu hated him, while in movie he hated Masamune Date more than Ieyasu. Mitsunari is voiced by Tomokazu Seki in all Japanese media. Troy Baker voiced him in English with the exception of End of Judgement, where he is replaced by Matthew Mercer.

In the Samurai Warriors video game series, Mitsunari is portrayed as a strategist of the Toyotomi forces against the Hōjō clan, using a fan in battle.

Mitsunari is a playable character in Pokémon Conquest (Pokémon + Nobunaga's Ambition in Japan), with his partner Pokémon being Pawniard and Bisharp.

In Nioh, a game based on the events of the late Sengoku period, Ishida is featured as a strategist under the Toyotomi clan.  After losing the Battle of Sekigahara, Mitsunari is betrayed by the antagonist Edward Kelley, an English alchemist, and transformed into a yokai (demon) by him.  The protagonist William Adams must then fight the transformed Misunari in a boss battle.

Mitsunari is also a suitor in the Japanese romance game Ikemen Sengoku where he is viewed as an innocent angel who adores Ieyasu. However, his adoration is often rebuked.

The manga Lone Wolf and Cub has the eponymous Lone Wolf tell Daigoro that Mitsunari, after being sentenced to death, was given a persimmon but refused to eat it on the grounds that persimmons made him sick. He was supposedly mocked for caring about indigestion when he was about to be executed, but Lone Wolf tells Daigoro that Mitsunari did the right thing by preserving his health until the last moment so he could fight for his lord.

References

Further reading 
 Bryant, Anthony. Sekigahara 1600: The Final Struggle for Power. Praeger Publishers, 2005

External links 

 SengokuDaimyo.com The website of Samurai Author and Historian Anthony J. Bryant
 SamuraiArchives.com 

1559 births
1600 deaths
Daimyo
People executed by Japan by decapitation
16th-century executions by Japan
Executed Japanese people
Toyotomi retainers